Covenant Fellowship Church is a 1500+ member non-denominational "Reformed charismatic" church in Glen Mills, Pennsylvania. The senior pastor is Jared Mellinger, who has led the church since 2008. Covenant Fellowship Church was established in 1984 as a "church plant" from Covenant Life Church in Gaithersburg, Maryland. Covenant Fellowship Church is a part of the family of churches called Sovereign Grace Churches. 
 
Covenant Fellowship Church began when 12 adults and their families moved from Maryland to the Philadelphia area. The church meetings were held in the Robert C. Gauntlett Community Center in Newtown Square, Pennsylvania from 1984 to 1999. In September 1999, the church moved to a newly constructed building in Glen Mills, Pennsylvania.

Covenant Fellowship Church is located on Fellowship Drive in Glen Mills, Pennsylvania. They currently hold one Sunday service at 10 a.m. Sunday services are also streamed live online at covfel.org/live. The service is translated into Spanish and ASL. The church is affiliated with Sovereign Grace Ministries.

Covenant Fellowship Church's other pastors are Mark Prater, Jim Donohue, Andy Farmer, Marty Machowski, Rob Flood, Jared Torrence, Bill Patton, Leo Parris and Joseph Stigora.
The previous senior pastor was Dave Harvey, who led the church as senior pastor from 1990 until 2008.   In 1998, Dennis Kowal Architects of Somerville, New Jersey was hired to design a permanent home which conveyed the concept of "refuge" using local materials, a welcoming footprint and a joyful, expansive interior.

External links
Covenant Fellowship Church Website
Sovereign Grace Ministries

References 

Christian organizations established in 1984
Churches in Delaware County, Pennsylvania
1984 establishments in Pennsylvania